The 2020 NCAA Division I Cross Country Championships was the 82nd annual NCAA Men's Division I Cross Country Championship and the 40th annual NCAA Women's Division I Cross Country Championship to determine the team and individual national champions of NCAA Division I men's and women's collegiate cross country running in the United States. In all, four different titles were contested: men's and women's individual and team championships. Results were track and field results reporting system. In the men's 10k, Conner Mantz of Brigham Young University took home the individual title in 29:26.1, while Northern Arizona University won the team title, scoring 60 points and defeating second-placed University of Notre Dame (87) and third-placed Oklahoma State University (142). In the women's 6k, Mercy Chelangat of the University of Alabama won the individual title in 20:01.1, while Brigham Young University won the team title with 96 points, beating second-placed NC State University (161) and third-placed Stanford University (207).

Due to the COVID-19 pandemic the championship was delayed until March 2021.

Women's title
Distance: 6,000 meters
(DC) = Defending champions

Women's Team Result (Top 10)

Women's Individual Result (Top 10)

Men's title
Distance: 10,000 meters

Men's Team Result (Top 10)

Men's Individual Result (Top 10)

See also
 NCAA Men's Division II Cross Country Championship 
 NCAA Women's Division II Cross Country Championship 
 NCAA Men's Division III Cross Country Championship 
 NCAA Women's Division III Cross Country Championship

References
 

NCAA Cross Country Championships
NCAA Division I Cross Country Championships
NCAA Division I Cross Country Championships
Stillwater, Oklahoma
Track and field in Oklahoma
NCAA Division I Cross Country Championships